Platyptilia spicula is a moth of the family Pterophoridae. It is known from Suriname.

The wingspan is about 22 mm. Adults are on wing in May.

External links

spicula
Endemic fauna of Suriname
Moths of South America
Moths described in 2006
Taxa named by Cees Gielis